The 2011–12 División de Honor was the 45th season of the top flight of the Spanish domestic rugby union competitions since 1953. It began in autumn 2011 and finished on May 12 with the Final. Valladolid won the title, while Alcobendas were relegated to División de Honor B.

Competition format
The regular season runs through 18 matchdays. Upon completion the regular season, it is the turn of championship playoffs. The breakdown is as follows;
Teams in 1st & 2nd at regular season standings receive a bye to semifinal.
Teams at 3rd, 4th, 5th & 6th position plays for the two vacant places in quarter-finals.
Team in 9th position plays the relegation playoff.
Team in 10th position is relegated.

Each win means 4 points to winning team.
A draw means 2 points for each team.
1 bonus point for a team that achieves 4 tries in a match.
A defeat by 7 or less points means 1 bonus point for defeated team.

Teams

Regular season standings

Source: Federación Española de Rugby

Championship playoffs

Bracket

Quarter-finals

Semifinals

Final

Relegation playoff
The relegation playoff was contested over two legs by Alcobendas, who finished 10th in División de Honor, and Hernani, the losing team from División de Honor B promotion playoff final. Hernani won the tie, winning 27-24 on aggregate.

1st leg

2nd leg

 Hernani promoted to División de Honor. Sanitas Alcobendas relegated to División de Honor B.

Scorers statistics

By try points

By total points

See also
División de Honor B de Rugby

References

External links
Official site

2011–12
 
Spain